Boitumelo Joyce Rabele (born 5 August 1996) is a Mosotho footballer who plays as a forward for South African club Mamelodi Sundowns FC and captains the Lesotho women's national team.

Early life
Rabale was raised in Maseru.

Club career
In 2015, Rabale won the inaugural Lesotho Women's Super League with Likhosatsana.

In 2016 and 2017, Rabale captained Bloemfontein Celtic and led the club to win the league.

In April 2017, Rabale won Lesotho's Sports Star of the Year award.

College career
Rabale left Bloemfontein Celtic  was awarded a Kick4Life Student-Athlete Scholarship where she moved to Lewis and Clark Community College. In January 2020, she was named the National Junior College Women's Soccer Player of the Year following her 2019 season with the LCCC Trailblazers, in which she was the league's top goalscorer with 57 goals and placed third with her team in the NJCAA Division National Tournament.

International career
Rabale capped for Lesotho at senior level during the 2018 Africa Women Cup of Nations qualification.

References

1996 births
Living people
People from Maseru
Lesotho women's footballers
Women's association football forwards
Lewis & Clark College alumni
Cape Breton University alumni
College women's soccer players in the United States
Mamelodi Sundowns F.C. players
Lesotho women's international footballers
Lesotho expatriate footballers
Lesotho expatriates in the United States
Expatriate women's soccer players in the United States
Lesotho expatriates in Canada
Expatriate women's soccer players in Canada
Lesotho expatriate sportspeople in South Africa
Expatriate women's soccer players in South Africa